The Estádio Anísio Haddad, usually known as Rio Pretão, is a multi-purpose stadium in São José do Rio Preto, Brazil. It is currently used mostly for football matches. The stadium has a capacity of 14,014 people. It was built in 1968.

Rio Pretão is owned by Rio Preto Esporte Clube. The stadium is named after Anísio Haddad, who was a president of Rio Preto Esporte Clube. The nickname Rio Pretão means Big Rio Preto.

History
In 1968, the works on Rio Pretão were completed. The inaugural match was played on April 21 of that year, when Ponte Preta beat Rio Preto 4–1. The first goal of the stadium was scored by Ponte Preta's Dicá.

The stadium's attendance record currently stands at 17,845, set on July 12, 1971 when Catanduvense beat Rio Preto 1–0.

References

Enciclopédia do Futebol Brasileiro, Volume 2 - Lance, Rio de Janeiro: Aretê Editorial S/A, 2001.

External links
 Templos do Futebol

Multi-purpose stadiums in Brazil
Football venues in São Paulo (state)